The 1966–67 season was the 94th season of competitive football in Scotland and the 70th season of Scottish league football.

Overview

A number of significant events occurred during the season. The domestic campaign was dominated by Celtic, who along with winning all 5 tournaments they entered, became the first British team to win the European Cup; the great Celtic team who achieved this were later nicknamed the Lisbon Lions.

1966–67 was arguably Scottish football's best ever season in European football, with Rangers reaching the final of the Cup Winners Cup and Kilmarnock reaching the Fairs Cup semi-finals. In addition, Dundee United marked their European debut by eliminating Fairs Cup holders Barcelona.

It was also a season in which the Scottish national team recorded one of their most celebrated victories, beating greatest rivals and World Cup holders England 3–2 at Wembley in the British Home Championship.

The season also marked the league debut of Clydebank, while it was the final appearance of Third Lanark, one of the founding members of the SFA and Scottish League, who went out of business in the summer of 1967.

Scottish League Division One

Celtic were champions for the second season running, losing only two matches, both to Dundee United; these were Celtic's only defeats against Scottish opposition during the entire season. They won the title at Ibrox, home of arch-rivals Rangers, in a 2–2 draw which meant they could no longer be caught (it was Rangers' final match of the season while Celtic had one more fixture to fulfil).

Clyde finished third, which is their highest ever league placing. Clyde did not qualify for Europe, however, because Rangers finished second and took the Inter-Cities Fairs Cup place.

St Mirren and Ayr United were relegated, meaning the former would be outside the top flight for the first time since 1936. Ayr managed only one league win during the whole campaign, and had to wait until April to record it.

Top scorer
Stevie Chalmers (Celtic) 21

Scottish League Division Two

Morton, relegated the previous year, made an immediate return to Division One. They won the title by an eleven-point margin from Raith Rovers, who were also promoted.

Clydebank, who had been established as a separate senior club in 1965 following their ill-fated merger with East Stirlingshire, were elected to the Scottish League in 1966, and finished third from bottom in their inaugural season.

Financially troubled Third Lanark finished in mid-table, but they dropped out of the Scottish League and folded, going into liquidation in the summer: they were the first League team to fold since 1933. The final league match for Third Lanark was a 5–1 defeat at Dumbarton on 28 April 1967.

Brechin City finished bottom of the league for the fourth time in six seasons.

Cup honours

Scottish Cup

The first round produced one of the most famous giant killing results in the history of the competition when Division Two outfit Berwick Rangers eliminated holders Rangers 1–0 at Shielfield, Sammy Reid scoring the game's only goal.

That result meant Celtic became clear favourites to lift the trophy, and they began with comfortable victories over Arbroath, Elgin City and Queen's Park. They then overcame Clyde in a replayed semi-final to set up a final meeting with Aberdeen, who had eliminated Dundee United at the penultimate stage. A 2–0 victory in the final saw Celtic lift the Cup for the 19th time, equalling Rangers' record in the competition.

Scottish Cup Final

League Cup

Celtic picked up their first trophy of the season courtesy of a 1–0 win against oldest rivals Rangers in the final. After winning all six matches in a section including Hearts, Clyde and St Mirren, Celtic also eliminated Dunfermline and, in the semi-finals, Airdrieonians on their way to the final. The other semi saw Rangers beat Aberdeen in a replay.

League Cup Final

Individual honours

Scottish clubs in Europe
Celtic made their debut in the European Cup and exceeded all expectations by lifting the trophy with a memorable victory over Inter Milan in the final in Lisbon, thanks to goals from Tommy Gemmell and Stevie Chalmers. Their achievement ended the stranglehold which Latin teams had hitherto exerted on the competition, as Celtic became not only the first Scottish champions of Europe, but indeed the first British and Northern European ones also. The Lisbon Lions, as they became known, remain the only Scottish side to have won the European Cup.

In a notably successful season for Scottish clubs in Europe, Rangers had the chance to win Glasgow's second continental trophy within a week after reaching the Cup Winners Cup final for the second time, only to narrowly lose out to Bayern Munich in Nuremberg. Earlier in May there had been the possibility of Scottish involvement in the final of all three European tournaments, but Kilmarnock lost out to Leeds United in their Fairs Cup semi-final meeting. Nevertheless, it remains the club's best European run.

Dundee United had a remarkable introduction to European football; drawn against Fairs Cup holders Barcelona, United eliminated the Spaniards with victories in both legs. Of Scotland's five representatives, only Dunfermline failed to make any great impact, losing to eventual winners Dinamo Zagreb in the Fairs Cup second round.

Celtic

Rangers

* Rangers progressed on a coin flip.

Dundee United

Dunfermline Athletic

Kilmarnock

Other honours

National

County

 - aggregate over two legs

Highland League

Scotland national team

Unbeaten Scotland became outright British champions for the first time in four years. Following a draw in Cardiff and victory at home to Northern Ireland, Scotland travelled to Wembley needing to beat England, who had won both their matches, to take the title. This was secured with a 3–2 win which has become legendary in Scottish football, not only because it was England's first defeat since becoming world champions the previous year, but due to Scotland's assured performance and the skillful arrogance of Jim Baxter, who at various times juggled the ball by himself.

At the same time, Scotland's Home Championship win got Scotland off to a good start in their first attempt to qualify for the European Championships, with this and the following season's tourney doubling as qualifying matches for the 1968 finals.

Scotland had begun the season with Kilmarnock manager Malky McDonald in temporary charge for the games against Wales and Northern Ireland. Bobby Brown was then appointed as the national team's first full-time manager, with the England match proving to be a memorable start to his tenure.

Key:
(H) = Home match
(A) = Away match
ECQG8 = European Championship qualifying - Group 8
BHC = British Home Championship

References

External links
Scottish Football Historical Archive

 
Seasons in Scottish football